Meng House, also known as The Hill House and Clough-Wallace House, is a historic home located at Union in Union County, South Carolina, United States.  It was built about 1832, and is a two-story, Greek Revival style frame dwelling.  It features two two-story Doric order porticos supported by four stucco-over-brick columns.  It has a two-story wing that houses the kitchen with bathrooms above.

It was added to the National Register of Historic Places in 1976.

References

Houses on the National Register of Historic Places in South Carolina
Greek Revival houses in South Carolina
Houses completed in 1832
Houses in Union County, South Carolina
National Register of Historic Places in Union County, South Carolina